Scleropyrum is a genus of trees in family Santalaceae first described as a genus in 1838. At present (September 2014), only one species is recognized, although several others are listed as "unresolved," meaning that further research is needed to determine affinities.

accepted species
Scleropyrum pentandrum (Dennst.) Mabb. - China, Indochina, Peninsular Malaysia, Singapore
synonyms of S. pentandrum

unresolved species

References

Santalaceae
Monotypic Santalales genera
Flora of Asia
Least concern plants
Taxonomy articles created by Polbot
Taxobox binomials not recognized by IUCN